Hans Hanssen (23 January 1853 – 26 May 1923) was a Norwegian politician for the Conservative Party and later the Liberal Left Party.

He was born at Ustmyr in Leinstranden as a son of farmers Hans Arnesen Ustmyr og Karen Lund. He inherited the family farm, but was also a merchant in Trondhjem from the 1870s. From 1898 to 1908 he was the bank director of Arbeiderforeningens spareskillingsbank. He was a member of Trondhjem city council from 1897 to 1903 and 1907 to 1910. He served as a deputy representative to the parliament of Norway from the constituency Bratøren og Ilen during the terms 1907–1909 and 1910–1912.

References

1853 births
1923 deaths
Norwegian businesspeople
Politicians from Trondheim
Deputy members of the Storting
Conservative Party (Norway) politicians
Free-minded Liberal Party politicians
20th-century Norwegian politicians